The World That Couldn't Be is an anthology of science fiction short-stories selected by Galaxy Science Fiction editor, H. L. Gold.

Contents
"The World That Couldn't Be" by Clifford D. Simak
"Brightside Crossing" by Alan E. Nourse
"Mezzerow Loves Company" by F. L. Wallace
"Eye for a What?" by Damon Knight
"A Woman's Place" by Mark Clifton
"A Gun for Dinosaur" by L. Sprague de Camp
"One for the Books" by Richard Matheson
"The Music Master of Babylon" by Edgar Pangborn
"Once a Greech" by Evelyn E. Smith

External links
 

1959 anthologies
Science fiction anthologies
Doubleday (publisher) books